Dorai–Bhagavan were an Indian filmmaking duo consisting of directors B. Dorai Raj (died 2000) and S. K. Bhagavan (5 July 1933 – 20 February 2023), active mainly in Kannada cinema. The duo directed twenty seven films together, most of which starred Rajkumar and were highly successful at box-office. Fourteen of them were based on Kannada novels. Bhagavan was the principal of Adarsha Film Institute, Bangalore.

Film career
S.K Bhagavan was born on 5 July 1933. He completed his schooling in Bangalore High school. At a young age, he was acting on stage dramas with Hirannaiah Mithra Mandali. He started his film career as an assistant to Kanagal Prabhakar Shastri in 1956 through the film Bhagyodaya. He then went on to direct his debut movie Sandhya Raga in 1966 though officially its direction was credited to A.C. Narasimha Murthy. However, next year, he was credited as the co-director of Rajadurgada Rahasya (1967) alongside A.C. Narasimha Murthy. His official directorial debut happened when he co-directed Jedara Bale (1968) with Dorai Raj under the name Dorai–Bhagavan thus becoming the first directors to make James Bond-style movies in Kannada.

The duo then directed movies like Kasturi Nivasa, Eradu Kanasu, Bayaludaari, Gaalimaatu, Chandanada Gombe, Hosa Belaku, Benkiya Bale, Jeevana Chaitra and more Bond-style movies such as Goa dalli C.I.D 999, Operation Jackpot Nalli C.I.D 999 and Operation Diamond Racket. Apart from Rajkumar, the duo directed many movies with  Anant Nag and Lakshmi, most of which were based on novels. After the death of Dorai Raj, Bhagavan ceased directing for many years – their last film was Baalondu Chaduranga in 1996. In 2019, he made his comeback at the age of 85 with Aduva Gombe, which marks 50th film of his direction.

Awards
Bhagavan was the principal of Adarsha Film Institute.

Filmography
Dorai–Bhagavan directed a number of films. Apart from directing movies, Bhagavan also acted in films including Bhagyodaya, Rowdy Ranganna, Vasantha Geetha, Shravana Bantu, Sootradhaara, Haalu Jenu, Jeevana Chaithra and Bangalore Mail. He mostly worked with music director duo Rajan–Nagendra and G. K. Venkatesh for most of his films.

Note*: This is a partial filmography. You can expand it.

References

External links 
 
 

1933 births
2000 deaths
2023 deaths
20th-century Indian film directors
Kannada film directors
Indian filmmaking duos
Film directors from Karnataka
Artists from Mysore
21st-century Indian film directors